Podskalie is a municipality (village) in Slovakia in the Považská Bystrica District. It has 7,68 km2 and 145 inhabitants.

References

External links

 

Villages and municipalities in Považská Bystrica District